Cuddington Heath is a village and (as Cuddington) a civil parish in the unitary authority of Cheshire West and Chester and the ceremonial county of Cheshire, England. The village is close to the border with Wales (the parish touches the Welsh community of Willington Worthenbury), and the nearest large town is Wrexham in Wales, about ten miles west. Other nearby villages are Threapwood, Malpas and Chorlton Lane. At the 2001 Census, the parish had a population of 180, falling slightly to 171 at the 2011 Census.

The parish is the site of Cuddington Hall. The Stockton family were lords of the manor from the 16th to the 18th century: the most eminent of the family  was Thomas Stockton (1609-1674), a  barrister  and  later a High Court judge  in Ireland.

References

External links

Villages in Cheshire
Civil parishes in Cheshire
Cheshire West and Chester